This is a list of adult nonfiction books that topped The New York Times Nonfiction Best Seller list in 1990.

See also

 New York Times Fiction Best Sellers of 1990
 1990 in literature
 Lists of The New York Times Nonfiction Best Sellers
 Publishers Weekly list of bestselling novels in the United States in the 1990s

References

1990
.
1990 in the United States